Isotopic may refer to:

 In the physical sciences, to do with chemical isotopes
 In mathematics, to do with a relation called isotopy; see Isotopy (disambiguation)
 In geometry, isotopic refers to facet-transitivity